The 1970 Ohio gubernatorial election was held on November 3, 1970. Democratic nominee John J. Gilligan defeated Republican nominee Roger Cloud with 54.19% of the vote.

Primary elections
Primary elections were held on May 5, 1970.

Democratic primary

Candidates
John J. Gilligan, former U.S. Representative
Robert E. Sweeney, former U.S. Representative
Mark McElroy, former Ohio Attorney General

Results

Republican primary

Candidates
Roger Cloud, Ohio State Auditor
Donald "Buz" Lukens, U.S. Representative
Paul W. Brown, Ohio Attorney General
Albert Sealy

Results

General election

Candidates
Major party candidates
John J. Gilligan, Democratic
Roger Cloud, Republican 

Other candidates
Edward T. Lawton, American Independent
Joseph Pirincin, Socialist Labor

Results

References

1970
Ohio
Gubernatorial